Chester Farm is a Commonwealth War Graves Commission burial ground for the dead of the First World War located in the Ypres Salient on the Western Front.

The cemetery grounds were assigned to the United Kingdom in perpetuity by the King of Belgium in recognition of the sacrifices made by the British Empire in the defence and liberation of Belgium during the war.

Foundation

Commonwealth troops began using the site as a cemetery in March 1915. The cemetery is named after a nearby farm, which was itself probably named by the 2nd Battalion of the Cheshire Regiment in 1915.

The dead are mostly grouped by battalion.

There are cenotaphs for six soldiers (five British and one Canadian) who are known or believed to be buried in the cemetery but whose actual plot was lost or destroyed. These stones usually have the Rudyard Kipling-derived footnote "Their glory shall not be blotted out".

Notable graves
The painter Ernest Stafford Carlos is buried here.

Gallery

References

External links

 
 

Commonwealth War Graves Commission cemeteries in Belgium
World War I cemeteries in Belgium
Cemeteries and memorials in West Flanders
Works of Edwin Lutyens in Belgium